L11 or L-11 may refer to:

Vehicles

Aircraft
 Albatros L 11, a German biplane bomber
 Daimler L11, a German monoplane fighter
 Lucas L11, a French ultralight

Locomotives
 LSWR L11 class, a British steam locomotive

Ships
 , a submarine of the United States Navy
 , a submarine of the Royal Navy
 , a destroyer of the Royal Navy
 , an amphibious warfare ships of the Royal Navy

Weapons

 L-11 76.2 mm tank gun, a Soviet tank gun
 Blohm & Voss L 11, a German experimental anti-ship missile
 M2 Browning, a machine gun designated L11 by the British Army
 Royal Ordnance L11, a British tank gun
 L-11, the assembly number of the Little Boy atomic bomb dropped on Hiroshima

Other uses

 60S ribosomal protein L11
 Barcelona Metro line 11, a light metro line in Barcelona, Spain
 Mitochondrial ribosomal protein L11
 Nikon Coolpix L11, a digital camera